AIW may stand for:
 International Union, Allied Industrial Workers of America
 Advocates for Injured Workers, a Toronto-based legal clinic
 Atlantic Intracoastal Waterway, an inland waterway in the United States
 Alice in Wonderland, an 1865 novel with many adaptations
 All-in-Wonder, a computer graphics card
 American Iron Works, a commercial metals fabrication company
 Avengers: Infinity War, a 2018 superhero film by Marvel Studios
 Ai-Ais Airport (IATA code AIW), in Ai-Ais, Namibia
 Atlantic Island Airways (ICAO code AIW), a Canadian airline
 Analytic Information Warehouse, a platform for analytics using electronic health record data

See also
 Alice in Wonderland (disambiguation)